Elias Davidson Pierce (18241897) was one of the key figures in the gold rush in 1860 to Idaho.

Pierce was a native of Harrison County, (West) Virginia.  In 1844 he purchased land in Indiana and relocated to Hartford City, where he studied law for a time before enlisting as a volunteer during the Mexican War.  After serving 8 months in Mexico, primarily on guard duty, he returned to Indiana, near death from dysentery, and was discharged in July 1848. In 1849, he went overland to California as part of the gold rush.  In 1852 Pierce served in the California House of Representatives.

Pierce, Idaho is named for Pierce.

Notes

References
Leonard J. Arrington. History of Idaho, Vol. 1. (Moscow, Idaho: University of Idaho Press, 1994) p. 183.

External links
Cleawater Historical Museum website
Idaho State Reference Series paper on Pierce

1824 births
1897 deaths
Members of the California State Assembly
People of pre-statehood Idaho
19th-century American politicians